Jarvis House, also known as the Ira Jarvis House, is a historic home located near Sparta, Alleghany County, North Carolina. Located on the property are the contributing log building known as the log house, erected before 1850; the two-story 1880s Ira Jarvis House; and a detached
stone cellar added in the early 1900s. The Ira Jarvis House is a simple tri-gable balloon-frame I-house with a hall and parlor plan.

It was listed on the National Register of Historic Places in 1991.

References

Houses on the National Register of Historic Places in North Carolina
Houses completed in 1880
Houses in Alleghany County, North Carolina
National Register of Historic Places in Alleghany County, North Carolina